Goris is a Dutch-language surname, originated from the Belgian region of Flanders. Notable people with the surname include:

Esther Goris (born 1963), Argentine actress
Ignace Goris (born 1942), Belgian retired football referee
Nathan Goris (born 1990), Belgian professional football player
René Goris (born 1946), Belgian long-distance runner
Rob Goris (1982-2012), Belgian professional road racing cyclist

See also
Goris, a city in Armenia (not related to this surname)
Gori (surname)

Surnames of Belgian origin
Dutch-language surnames